Dunnamona is a motte-and-bailey and National Monument in County Westmeath, Ireland.

Location

History and archaeology

Motte-and-bailey castles were a primitive type of castle built by the Norman invasion, a mound of earth topped by a wooden palisade. This region, known as Tethbae, was allotted to the Dillon family, descendants of Sir Henry de Leon (c. 1176 – 1244). They built the motte at Dunnamona ("hillfort of peat") as well as another at Drumraney, later abandoning the mottes for permanent stone castles.

References

Archaeological sites in County Westmeath
National Monuments in County Westmeath